The Works is a 3-disc compilation of Faith No More songs ranging from their second album Introduce Yourself to their sixth album Album of the Year. Virtually every song from The Real Thing is represented, as well as every song from the 1992 album Angel Dust, and every song from the CD release of Live At Brixton Academy, which had not been officially released in the US until this point. It also includes the soundtrack contribution "The Perfect Crime" and "Easy" which had only been included on non-US pressings of Angel Dust. This compilation does not, however contain many rarities and is not presented in chronological order and as such is viewed as disappointing by many fans.

Track listing

Footnotes

<li>^  Outtakes from The Real Thing sessions, released on the Live at the Brixton Academy album.

Faith No More albums
Alternative metal compilation albums
2008 compilation albums
Rhino Records compilation albums